A French Gigolo is a 2008 French comedy-drama film directed by Josiane Balasko and starring Nathalie Baye, Éric Caravaca, Isabelle Carré and Balasko.

Plot
Patrick is a male prostitute who hides his double life from his wife. When she finds out about his extramarital activities by answering his phone, she decides she will catch him in a hotel room with a client. At first offended by the behavior of her husband, she soon asks him to continue to be a male escort to help pay the bills. Patrick meets a female client, Judith, with whom they live out a complicated love story.

Cast

Development
A French Gigolo premiered at the Rome Film Festival in October 2008. The film was also screened at the 2009 Seattle International Film Festival.

References

External links
 
 

2008 films
2008 comedy-drama films
2000s French-language films
Films about male prostitution in France
Films about prostitution in Paris
Films directed by Josiane Balasko
Films set in Arizona
Films shot in Colorado
Films shot in Paris
Films shot in Utah
France 3 Cinéma films
French comedy-drama films
Gaumont Film Company films
2000s French films